Saint-Vincent-en-Bresse (literally Saint-Vincent in Bresse) is a commune in the Saône-et-Loire department in the region of Bourgogne-Franche-Comté in eastern France.

It lies 22 km (14 mi) southeast of Chalon-sur-Saône and 16 km (10 mi) west-northwest of Louhans.

Population

Sights
There are ruins of a medieval castle southeast of the town.

Name
The place name, formerly Saint-Vincent-en-Braisse, Latin Sanctus Vincentius in Brixia derives from that of St. Vincent born in Zaragoza, martyred at Valencia in 304 during Diocletian's persecutions.

See also
Communes of the Saône-et-Loire department

References

Communes of Saône-et-Loire